Tympanopalpus dorsalis is a species of beetle in the family Cerambycidae, and the only species in the genus Tympanopalpus. It was described by Redtenbacher in 1868.

References

Lamiini
Beetles described in 1868